Thangathin Thangam is a 1990 Indian Tamil-language action drama film directed by Siraj, starring Ramarajan and Ragasudha.

Plot 
A young village leader falls in love with a girl assuming that she is a villager. However, his life takes a turn when he comes to know that she is from a very rich family and a friend of his enemy.

Cast 
Ramarajan
Ragasudha
Jayabharathi
Goundamani
Vinu Chakravarthy
Senthil
Anandaraj
S. A. Rajkumar in a cameo appearance
Madhuri
 Mohana Priya

Soundtrack 
The music was composed by S. A. Rajkumar.

Reception 
C. R. K. of Kalki called it another film which faithfully mimics M. G. Ramachandran's style of films.

References

External links 
 

1990s action drama films
1990 films
1990s Tamil-language films
Films scored by S. A. Rajkumar
Indian action drama films